Anodontoceras is a genus of wood midges in the family Cecidomyiidae. There are three described species. The genus was established by Japanese entomologist Junichi Yukawa in 1967.

Species
Anodontoceras harrisi Jaschhof & Jaschhof, 2009
Anodontoceras saigusai Yukawa, 1967
Anodontoceras yukawai Jaschhof, 1998

References

Cecidomyiidae genera

Insects described in 1967
Taxa named by Junichi Yukawa